Pestano is a Spanish surname. Notable people with the surname include:

Ariel Pestano (born 1974), better known as El Veterano ("The Veteran"), Cuban baseball player
Mario Pestano (born 1978), Spanish discus thrower

Spanish-language surnames